Black Hammer may refer to:

Places
 Black Hammer, Minnesota, U.S.
 Black Hammer Township, Houston County, Minnesota, U.S.
 Black Hammer, a nickname by WWII Allied bomber crews for the Blechhammer, Nazi Germany camps and chemical plants

Other uses
 Black Hammer (comics), a comics series 
 Black Hammer, a 1951 novel by Gordon Landsborough
 The Black Hammer, a 1967 political work by Wes Andrews and Clyde Dalton
 Black Hammer Party, American political cult

See also
 Svarthamaren Mountain, Antarctica, the name meaning 'Black Hammer' in Norwegian